Frederick Levi Lunn (8 November 1895 – 1972) was an English professional footballer who played as a striker for Huddersfield Town, Sheffield Wednesday, Bristol Rovers, Southend United & Nuneaton Borough.

1895 births
1972 deaths
People from Marsden, West Yorkshire
English footballers
Association football forwards
English Football League players
Huddersfield Town A.F.C. players
Sheffield Wednesday F.C. players
Bristol Rovers F.C. players
Southend United F.C. players
Nuneaton Borough F.C. players
Sportspeople from Yorkshire